The Buenos Aires Half Marathon (official name: 21k Buenos Aires), is an annual road running competition over the half marathon distance  which takes place in Buenos Aires, Argentina in September. The route starts and ends in City Park and winds through the city center.

The 2011 edition of the race hosted the South American Marathon Championships. The race has also hosted the national championships for Argentina, four times for men (1997, 2001, 2015, 2017) and four times for women (1997, 1999, 2001, 2015). The course records are held by Brazilian Marílson Gomes dos Santos (1:01:13) and home athlete Florencia Borelli (1:11:58).

Past winners

Key:

References

List of winners
Buenos Aires Half Marathon. Association of Road Racing Statisticians. Retrieved 2018-04-11.

External links
Official website 

K
Half marathons
Athletics competitions in Argentina
Recurring sporting events established in 1989
1989 establishments in Argentina
September sporting events